Ulmus glaucescens var. glaucescens is a Chinese tree endemic to mountain slopes at elevations of 2000–2400 m in the provinces of Gansu, Hebei, Henan, Liaoning, Nei Mongol, Ningxia, eastern Qinghai, Shaanxi, Shandong, and Shanxi.

Description
The variety is distinguished by a "Samara glabrous except stigmatic surface pubescence in notch. Fl. and fr. March–May".

Pests and diseases
No information available.

Cultivation
The tree is very rare in cultivation beyond China.

Accessions

North America
Morton Arboretum, US. Acc. details not known.

Europe
Grange Farm Arboretum, Lincolnshire, UK. Two grafted trees from cuttings ex Morton. Acc. no. 1130.

References

glaucescens var. glaucescens
Trees of China
Flora of China
Trees of Asia
Ulmus articles missing images
Elm species and varieties